Heliotropium crispum is a species of flowering plant in the family Boraginaceae, native to western Africa (including the Canary Islands), Egypt, Sudan, south-western Asia, and Pakistan. It was first described by René Louiche Desfontaines.

Description
Heliotropium crispum is a very variable annual or perennial herbaceous plant. It has greyish leaves and dense cymes of small white flowers.

Distribution and habitat
Heliotropium crispum is native to western Africa, from the Canary Islands, Mauritania and Senegal to Nigeria, Egypt and Sudan, and to Saudi Arabia, Afghanistan and Pakistan. In the Canary Islands, it is found on dry (leeward) southern or western slopes of all the islands.

References

crispum
Flora of Africa
Flora of Saudi Arabia
Flora of Afghanistan
Flora of Pakistan